Israel participated in the Eurovision Song Contest 2017. Israeli broadcaster Israel Broadcasting Authority (IBA) collaborated with the commercial broadcaster Keshet and Tedy Productions which organised the reality singing competition HaKokhav HaBa L'Eurovizion ("The Next Star For Eurovision") to select the singer. The winner of the Israeli national selection was Imri Ziv and a committee of the Israeli broadcaster internally selected for him the song "I Feel Alive" written by Dolev Ram and Penn Hazut. The song was presented to the public on 13 March 2017.

Israel was drawn to compete in the second semi-final of the Eurovision Song Contest which took place on 11 May 2017. Performing as the closing entry during the show in position 18, "I Feel Alive" was announced among the top 10 entries of the second semi-final and therefore qualified to compete in the final on 13 May.

Background 

Prior to the 2017 contest, Israel had participated in the Eurovision Song Contest thirty-nine times since its first entry in 1973. Israel has won the contest on three occasions: in 1978 with the song "A-Ba-Ni-Bi" performed by Izhar Cohen and the Alphabeta, in 1979 with the song "Hallelujah" performed by Milk and Honey, and in 1998 with the song "Diva" performed by Dana International. Since the introduction of semi-finals to the format of the Eurovision Song Contest in 2004, Israel has, to this point, managed to qualify to the final six times, including three top ten results in 2005 with Shiri Maimon and "HaSheket SheNish'ar" placing fourth, in 2008 with Boaz and "The Fire in Your Eyes" placing ninth, and in 2015 with Nadav Guedj and "Golden Boy" placing ninth. Israel had failed to qualify to the final for four consecutive years between 2011 and 2014 prior to their qualification in 2015. In 2016, Hovi Star represented Israel in Stockholm, Sweden with the song "Made of Stars". It ended 14th out of 26 entries in the final.

The Israeli entry for the 2017 Contest in Kyiv, Ukraine was selected through the reality singing competition HaKokhav HaBa L'Eirovizion ("The Next Star for Eurovision"), which was organised by Keshet and Tedy Productions. This was the fourth time that the Israeli entry would be selected through a collaboration with Keshet and Tedy Productions.

Before Eurovision

HaKokhav HaBa L'Eurovizion 

The singer who would perform the Israeli entry for the Eurovision Song Contest 2017 was selected through the reality singing competition HaKokhav HaBa L'Eurovizion ("The Next Star for Eurovision"), the original version of the international format Rising Star produced by Tedy Productions and Keshet Media Group. HaKokhav HaBa was used in 2015 and 2016 to select the Israeli artist for Eurovision. The shows were hosted by Assi Azar and Rotem Sela and featured a judging panel composed of Asaf Amdursky, Keren Peles, Harel Skaat (2010 Israeli Eurovision entrant) and Static & Ben-El Tavori.
The competition consisted of ten shows, which commenced on 1 January and concluded on 13 February 2017. All shows in the competition were broadcast on Channel 2 as well as online via mako.co.il.

In the audition phase of the competition, performers were required to achieve 70% of the votes during their performance in order to advance; each member of the judging panel could boost a performer's score by 10%. The judging panel then selected the top eight from all of the performers that advanced from the audition phase. The top eight then competed in four duels of two performers each. The winners of the duels qualified directly for the next show and the remaining four contestants competed in two duels in the second round. The winners of the duels in the second round advanced to the next show. The remaining six performers then competed in three duels where the three duel winners entered the final, while the remaining three contestants participated in the second round. Out of the three performers in the second round the best scoring participant qualified for the final. The four finalists were: Beatbox Element, Diana Golbi, Imri Ziv and Julieta. Imri Ziv was a backing singer for Israel at the Eurovision Song Contest 2015 and 2016.

Shows

Final 
In the second round of the final the votes of the jury were symbolical, the winner was decided solely by the viewers who voted via the mobile application.

Promotion
Imri Ziv made several appearances across Europe to specifically promote "I Feel Alive" as the Israeli Eurovision entry. Between 3 and 6 April, Ziv took part in promotional activities in Tel Aviv where he performed during the Israel Calling event held at the Ha'teatron venue. On 8 April, Imri Ziv performed during the Eurovision in Concert event which was held at the Melkweg venue in Amsterdam, Netherlands and hosted by Cornald Maas and Selma Björnsdóttir. On 15 April, he performed during the Eurovision Spain Pre-Party, which was held at the Sala La Riviera venue in Madrid, Spain.

The music video of the song released ahead of the contest made reference to Ziv's previous experiences at Eurovision, when he performed as a backing singer for Nadav Guedj in 2015 and to Hovi Star in 2016.

At Eurovision 

According to Eurovision rules, all nations with the exceptions of the host country and the "Big Five" (France, Germany, Italy, Spain and the United Kingdom) are required to qualify from one of two semi-finals in order to compete for the final; the top ten countries from each semi-final progress to the final. The European Broadcasting Union (EBU) split up the competing countries into six different pots based on voting patterns from previous contests, with countries with favourable voting histories put into the same pot. On 31 January 2017, a special allocation draw was held which placed each country into one of the two semi-finals, as well as which half of the show they would perform in. Israel was placed into the second semi-final, to be held on 11 May 2017, and was scheduled to perform in the second half of the show.

Once all the competing songs for the 2017 contest had been released, the running order for the semi-finals was decided by the shows' producers rather than through another draw, so that similar songs were not placed next to each other. Originally, Israel was set to perform in position 19, closing the show and following Estonia. However, following Russia's withdrawal from the contest on 13 April and subsequent removal from the running order of the second semi-final, Israel's performing position shifted to 18.

Semi-final
Imri Ziv took part in technical rehearsals on 3 April and 6 May, followed by dress rehearsals on 10 and 11 May. This included the jury show on 10 May where the professional juries of each country watched and voted on the competing entries.

The Israeli performance featured Imri Ziv dressed in a black sleeveless T-shirt and black trousers. A flashing white light backstage took up the whole video wall, while Imri stood to sing the first verse. White circles were projected on the LED screens during the chorus. The backing singers were all dressed in black. Imri was joined by two dancers dressed in white. There were flashing red and blue lights pulsating in the background. In addition to that, Imri's image was projected on the video wall. As the song neared its end, flashing orange lights flashed in the background.

At the end of the show, Israel was announced as having finished in the top 10 and subsequently qualifying for the grand final. It was later revealed that Israel placed third in the semi-final, receiving a total of 207 points: 132 points from the televoting and 75 points from the juries.

Final
Shortly after the second semi-final, a winners' press conference was held for the ten qualifying countries. As part of this press conference, the qualifying artists took part in a draw to determine which half of the grand final they would subsequently participate in. This draw was done in the reverse order the countries appeared in the semi-final running order. Israel was drawn to compete in the first half. Following this draw, the shows' producers decided upon the running order of the final, as they had done for the semi-finals. Israel was set to open the show and perform in position 1, before the entry from Poland.

Imri Ziv once again took part in dress rehearsals on 12 and 13 May before the final, including the jury final where the professional juries cast their final votes before the live show. Imri Ziv performed a repeat of his semi-final performance during the final on 13 May, and finished in 23rd place with 39 points: 5 points from the televoting and 34 points from the juries.

The Israeli spokesperson was Ofer Nachshon, who announced the country's jury votes. As he did, he informed viewers of the contest that the Israeli broadcaster, IBA, would be shutting down momentarily, therefore ending Israeli participation in the Eurovision Song Contest. IBA's replacement, KAN, was ineligible to join the EBU (the requirement for participation) at the time. However, KAN later joined the EBU in time to supply an Israeli participation, and victory, in the next edition of the contest.

Voting

Points awarded to Israel

Points awarded by Israel

Detailed voting results
The following members comprised the Israeli jury:
 Tal Sondak (jury chairperson)singer, represented Israel in the 2001 contest
 Noy Alooshemusician, journalist
 Kobi Oshratcomposer, conductor; composed and conducted the 1979, 1985, and 1992 Israeli contest entries; conducted the 1987 and 1991 Israeli contest entries
 Ronit Rollandmusician, songwriter
 journalist, radio host

Notes and references

Notes

References 

2017
Countries in the Eurovision Song Contest 2017
Eurovision